Gruffy is a commune in the Haute-Savoie department in the Auvergne-Rhône-Alpes region in south-eastern France.

Geography
The Chéran forms the commune's south-western border.

See also
Communes of the Haute-Savoie department

References

Communes of Haute-Savoie